Francisco "Fran" Pérez Martínez (born 9 September 2002) is a Spanish professional footballer who plays as a winger for Valencia Mestalla.

Club career
Pérez began playing football at the youth academy of Lacross Babel, before moving to the youth side of Valencia in 2011. He worked his way up their youth categories, before being promoted to Valencia Mestalla in 2020. On 20 November 2020, he signed a professional contract with Valencia for 2 years.

López made his professional – and La Liga – debut with Valencia on 29 August 2022, coming on as a late substitute in a 1–0 loss to Atlético Madrid.

Personal life
Pérez is the son of the former Spanish footballer Francisco Rufete.

Playing style
Pérez is known for his incredible speed an strength. He was a prolific goalscorer in his youth, and is a simple and effective dribbler.

References

External links
 
 
 

2002 births
Living people
Sportspeople from Valencia
Spanish footballers
Association football wingers
Valencia CF Mestalla footballers
Valencia CF players
La Liga players
Tercera Federación players